The following is a list of compositions by Russian composer Mily Balakirev. All are for solo piano unless otherwise indicated below.

Works with opus numbers 
 Piano Concerto No. 1 in F minor, Op. 1 (1855–1856)
 String quartet, Op. 2 (unfinished)
 Octet, Op. 3 (1855-56)
 Grande Fantasie on Russian Folk Songs, Op. 4, for piano and orchestra (1852)
 Piano Sonata No. 1 in B minor, Op. 5 (1855-56)
 Overture on a Spanish March Theme, orchestra, Op. 6 (1857)
 Piano Concerto No. 2 in E major, Op. posth. (1861–1910, unfinished, completed by Sergei Lyapunov)
 Piano Sonata No. 2 in B minor, Op. 102 (1905)

Works with dates 
 Islamey, Oriental fantasy (1869, revised 1902)
 Reminiscences on Glinka’s opera "A Life for the Tsar", fantasy (2nd version of Fantasy on Glinka's themes) (1854–1855, revised 1899)
 Scherzo No. 1 in B minor (1856)
 Overture on a Spanish March Theme, orchestra (1857)
 Overture on Three Russian Themes, orchestra (1858)
 King Lear (Korol' Lir), incidental music Shakespeare's play (1858–1861, orchestra, revised 1902-1905)
 Polka in F minor (1859)
 Mazurka No. 1 in A major (1861–1884)
 Mazurka No. 2 in C minor (1861–1884)
 Russia (Rus'), Second Overture on Russian Themes, for orchestra, Symphonic Poem (1863–1864, revised 1884)
 Jota aragonesa (after Glinka) (1864)
 "The Lark" ("Zhavoronok"), transcription of No. 10 from A Farewell to Saint Petersburg by Glinka (1864)
 Symphony No. 1 in C major (1864–1866 & 1893-1897)
 Overture on Czech Themes "In Bohemia" ("V Chechii"), symphonic poem, orchestra, (1867, revised 1905)
 Tamara, symphonic poem, orchestra (1867–1882)
 Au jardin (In the Garden), étude-idylle in D major (1884)
 Mazurka No. 3 in B minor (1886)
 Mazurka No. 4 in G major (1886)
 Nocturne No. 1 in B minor (1898)
 Dumka (1900)
 Mazurka No. 5 in D major (1900)
 Scherzo No. 2 in B minor (1900)
 Waltz No. 1 in G major "Valse di bravura" (1900)
 Waltz No. 2 in F minor "Valse mélancolique" (1900)
 Symphony No. 2 in D minor (1900–1908)
 Berceuse in D major (1901)
 Gondellied in A minor (1901)
 Nocturne No. 2 in B minor (1901)
 Scherzo No. 3 in F major (1901)
 Tarantella in B major (1901)
 Waltz No. 3 in D major "Valse-impromptu" (1901)
 Suite in B minor (1901–1908)
 Capriccio in D major (1902)
 Mazurka No. 6 in A major (1902)
 Nocturne No. 3 in D minor (1902)
 Spanish Melody (1902)
 Spanish Serenade (1902)
 Toccata in C minor (1902)
 Tyrolienne (1902)
 Waltz No. 4 in B major "Valse de concert" (1902)
 Cantata on the Inauguration of the Glinka Memorial (dedicated to Mikhail Glinka), chorus and orchestra (1902–1904)
 Chant du pecheur (1903)
 Humoresque in D major (1903)
 Phantasiestück in D major (1903)
 Rêverie in F major (1903)
 Waltz No. 5 in D major (1903)
 Waltz No. 6 in F minor (1903–1904)
 Romance (transcription for piano solo of the second movement of Chopin’s Piano Concerto No. 1, Op. 11) (1905)
 La fileuse in D major (1906)
 Mazurka No. 7 in E minor (1906)
 Novelette in A major (1906)
 Waltz No. 7 in G minor (1906)
 Impromptu (after Chopin's Preludes in E minor and B major) (1907)
 Esquisses (Sonatina) in G major (1909)
 Suite in D Minor of Four Pieces of F. Chopin (1909)

Undated works 
 Complainte
 Fantasia
 Overture on the Themes of 3 Russian Songs, for orchestra
 "Say not that love will pass", transcription from a song by Glinka

Songs with dates 
 "Spanish Song" ("Ispanskaya pesnya"), for voice and piano (Forgotten Songs No. 3) (1855)
 "The Clear Moon has Risen" (1858)
 "The Knight" (1858) (20 Songs, No. 7)
 "Song of Selim" ("Pesnya Selima") (1858) (20 Songs, No. 11)
 "Hebrew Melody" (20 songs, no. 13) (1859)
 "Over the Lake" ("Nad ozerom"), song for voice and piano (1895–1896) (10 Songs, No. 1)
 "The Wilderness" (10 songs, No. 2) (1895–1896)
 "I Loved Him" ("Ya lyubila ego"), song for voice and piano (10 Songs 1895-96, No. 5)
 "The Pine Tree" (1895–1896) (10 Songs, No. 6)
 "Nocturne" (1895–1896) (10 Songs, No. 7)
 "Vision" ("Son") (10 Songs, No. 2) (1903–04)
 "7th November" (10 Songs, No. 4) (1903–04)
 "The yellow leaf trembles" ("Pesnya: Zholty list") (10 Songs, No. 8) (1903–04)
 "Look, my Friend" ("Vzglyani, moy drug") (20 Songs, No. 6) (1903–04)
 "The Dream" ("Son") (20 songs, No. 20) (1903–04)
 "Dawn" ("Zarya") (1909)

Undated songs 
 "Intonation"
 "My Heart Is Torn" ("Tak i rvetsya dusha"), song for voice and piano (20 Songs, No. 9)
 "Selim's Song" ("Pesnya Selima"), for voice and piano (20 Songs, No. 11)
 "The Crescent Moon" ("Vzoshol na nebo mesyats yasnïy"), song for voice and piano (20 Songs, No. 5)
 "Thou Art So Captivating" ("Tï plenitel'noy negi polna"), song for voice and piano (Forgotten Songs, No. 1)
 "Toujours, on me dit 'grand sot'"
 "When I Hear Thy Voice" ("Slïshu li golos tvoy"), song for voice and piano (20 Songs, No. 18)

 
Balakirev, Mily, List of compositions